The authorship of the Petrine epistles (First and Second Peter) is an important question in biblical criticism, parallel to that of the authorship of the Pauline epistles, since scholars have long sought to determine who were the exact authors of the New Testament letters. Most scholars today conclude that Saint Peter was not the author of the two epistles that are attributed to him and that they were written by two different authors.

Peter's ability to write
An issue common to both epistles of Peter, as well as various non-canonical works that claim to be written by Peter, is whether Peter even had the capability to write them. More generally, Peter is agreed to be a fisherman from Capernaum, a comparatively small and likely monolingual town. In the era of Roman Judea, literacy was rare, the ability to write rarer still, and the ability to write detailed philosophical tracts (rather than simple receipts and contracts) rarest of all. What advanced literacy training did exist was almost exclusively taught to the children of the elite in large towns such as Jerusalem, rather than fishermen in small towns. As such, most scholars find Acts' claim that Peter was uneducated credible. While it is of course possible that Peter embarked upon adult education later in his life after the time period Acts described, such a feat would have been highly unusual for the era. Even if Peter did pursue education later in life, there is little indication that Peter would have learnt or spoke fluent Greek in his livelihood before Jesus's call, as multilingualism was generally only seen in towns closely involved in trade. So Peter would not only have had to learn writing, but also a new language.

There exist a number of possibilities whereby Peter could have been the source of the epistles attributed to him without directly writing them.  The "secretary" hypothesis is the most common of these, that Peter either dictated to a literate associate or perhaps even just summarized the gist of his thoughts while the secretary turned it into a proper Greek letter.  In one version of this, Peter did learn spoken Greek, but dictated the letters to a secretary capable of writing Greek.  This still assumes a truly impressive leap in education for Peter late in his life; the epistle 1 Peter is in fluent Greek and the author well acquainted with the Septuagint, the Greek translation of the Old Testament. 

Another version that assumes less of Peter is that he dictated in Aramaic, while the secretary translated to Greek.  An issue against this possibility is that the letters do not show signs of Aramaic speech patterns turned into Greek ones; if this occurred, then the secretary modified the message sufficiently well to turn the passage into Greek idiom and style rather than Aramaic idiom and style.  Another raised possibility is that a Greek-writing associate of Peter was summarizing his general thoughts yet essentially writing the letter themselves.  Finally, it is possible that the author was a disciple of Peter who wrote later in Peter's honor, especially if the date of composition is believed to be well after Peter's death (such as 2 Peter).  The issue with the final two is that the letters directly identify themselves as being directly from Peter; if a coauthor was involved, the letters would be more properly identified as coming from the coauthor under Peter's guidance or inspiration.  Additionally, for the final possibility of a disciple writing in Peter's honor, any proof that such an unknown author indeed knew Peter closely, rather than simply giving his own personal views to Peter, has long since vanished.

First epistle

Author identifies himself as Peter
The author of the First Epistle of Peter identifies himself in the opening verse as "Peter, an apostle of Jesus", and the view that the epistle was written by St. Peter is attested to by a number of Church Fathers: Irenaeus (140–203), Tertullian (150–222), Clement of Alexandria (155–215) and Origen of Alexandria (185–253). If  Polycarp, who was martyred in 156, and Papias alluded to this letter, then it must have been written before the mid-2nd century.  However, the Muratorian Canon of c. 170 did not contain this, and a number of other General epistles, suggesting they were not yet being read in the Western churches.  Unlike the Second Epistle of Peter, the authorship of which was debated in antiquity (see also Antilegomena), there was little debate about Peter's authorship of the First Epistle of Peter until the advent of biblical criticism in the 18th century. Assuming the letter is authentic and written by Peter, who was martyred c. 64, the date of this epistle is probably between 60 and 64.

Theory of Silvanus as author
One theory is that 1 Peter was written by a secretary such as
 Mark or by Silvanus, who is mentioned towards the end of the epistle: "By Silvanus, our faithful brother, as I account him, I have written unto you briefly" (5:12). In the following verse the author includes greetings from "she that is in Babylon, elect together with you," taken for the church "in Babylon", which may be an early use of this Christian title for Rome, familiar from the Book of Revelation.  Some scholars argue that there is no evidence that Rome was called Babylon by the Christians until the Book of Revelation was published, i.e. c. 90–96 AD and therefore conclude that Babylon on the Euphrates was intended. See also Syriac Christianity.

Use of Greek and Hebrew
Many scholars believe the author was not Peter, but an unknown author writing after Peter's death. Estimates for the date of composition range from 60 to 112 AD. Most critical scholars are skeptical that the apostle Simon Peter, the fisherman on the Sea of Galilee, actually wrote the epistle, because of the urbane cultured style of the Greek and the lack of any personal detail suggesting contact with the historical Jesus of Nazareth. The letter contains about thirty-five references to the Hebrew Bible, all of which, however, come from the Septuagint translation, an unlikely source for historical Peter the apostle, but appropriate for a Hellenized audience; thus the use of the Septuagint helps define the audience. The Septuagint was a Greek translation that had been created at Alexandria for the use of those Jews who could not easily read the Hebrew and Aramaic of the Tanakh, and for proselytes. A historical Jew in Galilee would not have heard Scripture in this form, it is argued.

Pseudepigraphy written around 70–90
If the epistle is taken to be pseudepigraphal, the majority scholarly view is that it should be dated to 70–90. Stephen L. Harris, on the other hand, argues for an even later date, such as during the persecution of Domitian (c. 95) or of Trajan (c. 112).

Authority associated with Peter
The author's use of Peter's name demonstrates the authority associated with Peter. The author also claims to have witnessed the sufferings of Christ (1 Peter 5:1) and makes allusions to several historical sayings of Jesus indicative of eyewitness testimony (e.g., compare Luke 12:35 with 1 Peter 1:13, Matthew 5:16 with 1 Peter 2:12, and Matthew 5:10 with 1 Peter 3:14).

Second Epistle

Author presents himself as Peter
The Second Epistle of Peter opens by identifying the author as “Simon Peter (in some translations, ‘Simeon’ or ‘Shimon’), a servant and an apostle of Jesus Christ” (spelling the name differently from 1 Peter or the rest of the New Testament, except for Acts 15:14). Elsewhere, the author clearly presents himself as the Apostle Peter, stating that the Lord revealed to him the approach of his own death, that he was an eyewitness of the Transfiguration, that he had previously written another epistle to the same audience (cf. 1 Peter), and he called Paul the Apostle “our beloved brother”.

Clues in support of pseudepigraphy
Although 2 Peter internally purports to be a work of the apostle, most biblical scholars have concluded that Peter is not the author, and instead consider the epistle pseudepigraphical.  Reasons for this include its linguistic differences from 1 Peter, its apparent use of Jude, possible allusions to 2nd-century gnosticism, encouragement in the wake of a delayed parousia, and weak external support.  In addition, specific passages offer further clues in support of pseudepigraphy, namely the author's assumption that his audience is familiar with multiple Pauline epistles, his implication that the Apostolic generation has passed, and his differentiation between himself and "the apostles of the Lord and Savior".

Arguments for Petrine authorship
A minority of scholars have disagreed with this position and put forward reasons in support of genuine Petrine authorship. They argue that the letter did not fit a specific pattern of what they consider pseudepigraphy. The Transfiguration lacks the embellishment which E. M. B. Green argues was common in apocryphal books. Michael Kruger argues that the voice of God in the Transfiguration is similar but not identical to the synoptic gospels, as if Peter was recalling from memory, and notes that the epistle uses similar language  to Peter's speeches in Acts.  An uncommon title, “our beloved brother,” is given to Paul, where later literature used other titles.

Relation between 2 Peter and Jude
2 Peter shares a number of shared passages with the Epistle of Jude, 1:5 with Jude 3; 1:12 with Jude 5; 2:1 with Jude 4; 2:4 with Jude 6; 2:6 with Jude 7; 2:10–11 with Jude 8–9; 2:12 with Jude 10; 2:13–17 with Jude 11–13; 3:2f with Jude 17f; 3:14 with Jude 24; and 3:18 with Jude 25. Because the Epistle of Jude is much shorter than 2 Peter, and due to various stylistic details, the scholarly consensus is that Jude was the source for the similar passages of 2 Peter.

Other scholars argue that even if 2 Peter used Jude, that does not exclude Petrine authorship. Finally, some scholars have proposed that differences in style could be explained by Peter having employed different amanuenses (secretaries) for each epistle, or if Peter wrote the second letter himself, while using Silvanus (Silas) as an amanuensis for the first.

Two different authors
Most scholars believe that 1 Peter and 2 Peter were not written by the same author(s). 1 Peter is essentially traditional, drawing on key Psalms, key chapters of Isaiah, and wisdom sayings, some of which are found elsewhere in the New Testament. 2 Peter, however, favors a more allusive style and is dependent on more obscure sources.

Issue of authorship of 2 Peter already settled for most scholars
The great majority of scholars agree that Peter has not written this letter. For example, textual critic Daniel Wallace (who maintains that Peter was the author) writes that, for most experts, "the issue of authorship is already settled, at least negatively: the apostle Peter did not write this letter" and that "the vast bulk of NT scholars adopt this perspective without much discussion". Werner Kümmel exemplifies this position, stating, "It is certain, therefore, that 2 Pet does not originate with Peter, and this is today widely acknowledged", as does Stephen L Harris, who states that "[v]irtually no authorities defend the Petrine authorship of 2 Peter."  Evangelical scholars D. A. Carson and Douglas J. Moo wrote that "most modern scholars do not think that the apostle Peter wrote this letter. Indeed, for no other letter in the New Testament is there a greater consensus that the person who is named as the author could not, in fact, be the author." Despite this broad denial by the majority of modern scholars, other scholars view the arguments of the majority to be largely inconclusive. Likewise, Stanley Porter points to the fact that 2 Peter's acceptance to the canon by early Christians presumes that they were sure that Peter wrote it. In the end, Carson and Moo point to the controversy reflective of this issue, stating, "We are therefore left with the choice of accepting the letter's prima facie claim to have been written by the apostle Peter or viewing it as a forgery hardly deserving of canonical status."

References

Peter
Saint Peter